"Crave You" is a song released by the Australian DJ duo Flight Facilities, written by singer-songwriter Giselle Rosselli and producers Hugo Gruzman and James Lyell. The song was released in September 2010 as the band's debut single and features on the band's debut studio album, Down to Earth (2014). The single was produced by James Wiseman and Olivia Hancock-Tomlin.

The song polled at #19 on Triple J's Hottest 100 of 2010. It also came in at #39 in the Hottest 100 of the Decade.

In 2015, the song was listed at number 24 in In the Mix's '100 Greatest Australian Dance Tracks of All Time'.

Formats and track listings

"Crave You"
Digital Download
 "Crave You"  – 3:55

"Crave You" – remixes
Digital Download 
 "Crave You" (Version 2) – 7:33
 "Crave You" (James Curd Pretty Mix) – 4:02
 "Crave You" (An-2 Remix) – 7:48
 "Crave You" (The C-90s Remix) – 7:29
 "Crave You" (Cassian Remix) – 5:38
 "Crave You" (Graz Remix) – 4:31
 "Crave You" (Ted & Francis Dub) – 4:18
 "Crave You" (Adventure Club Remix) –   3:56

References

2010 songs
2010 singles
Flight Facilities songs